The Davis gun was the first true recoilless gun developed and taken into service. It was developed by Commander Cleland Davis  of the United States Navy in 1910, just prior to World War I.

Development

Davis' design connected two guns back to back, with the backwards-facing gun loaded with lead balls and grease of the same weight as the shell in the other gun, acting as a counter. His idea was used experimentally by the British and Americans as an anti-Zeppelin and anti-submarine weapon mounted on the British Handley Page O/100 and O/400 bombers and the American Curtiss Twin JN and Curtiss HS-2L and H-16 flying boats. The direct development of the gun ended with the end of World War I in November 1918, but the firing principle has been copied by later designs.

Description
The 3-inch gun carried a pressure of 15 tons per square inch (2,109 kg per cm2) when fired. Usually a Lewis machine gun was mounted on top of the Davis gun's barrel for use in sighting and as an auxiliary and anti-aircraft weapon.

Aircraft used
The gun was tested on various aircraft and some aircraft were designed to carry the gun:
Airco DH.4
Armstrong-Whitworth FK.5 and FK.6 - "escort fighter" triplane
Curtiss F5L - patrol flying boat used by US Navy
Felixstowe Porte Baby - large flying boat
Handley-Page O/100 - twin engined bombers with 6pdr Davis gun added for ground attack and anti-submarine
Handley-Page O/400 - larger version of the O/400
Naval Aircraft Factory N-1 - patrol floatplane designed by US Navy, four prototypes built, project canceled
Short Type 184
Short 310-B seaplane
Pemberton-Billing PB.29E
Pemberton-Billing PB.31E - long endurance anti-Zeppelin night fighter with 37mm Davis gun, prototypes only
Robey-Peters RRF.25 Gun-carrier - two Davis guns. Single prototype for Royal Navy completed

Surviving examples
There are examples at the Naval Aviation Museum at Pensacola, Florida, the Imperial War Museum in London, and the Kentucky Historical Society in Frankfort, Kentucky.

See also
COW 37 mm gun

References

External links
 Patent 1108714
 Patent 1108717

Recoilless rifles of the United States
World War I aircraft guns